The Strahlhorn (4,190 m) is a mountain of the Swiss Pennine Alps, located south of Saas-Fee and east of Zermatt in the canton of Valais. It lies on the range that separates the Mattertal from the Saastal and is located approximately halfway between the Rimpfischhorn and the Schwarzberghorn.

There are three less known peaks of the same name in Switzerland (3027m, 3194m, 3200m).

See also

List of 4000 metre peaks of the Alps

References

Sources
 Dumler, Helmut and Willi P. Burkhardt, The High Mountains of the Alps, London: Diadem, 1994

External links

 
 Strahlhorn on Hikr

Alpine four-thousanders
Mountains of the Alps
Mountains of Valais
Pennine Alps
Mountains of Switzerland
Four-thousanders of Switzerland